|}

The James Seymour Stakes is a Listed flat horse race in Great Britain open to horses aged three years or older.
It is run on the Rowley Mile course at Newmarket over a distance of 1 mile and 2 furlongs (2,012 metres), and it is scheduled to take place each year in late October or early November.

The race is named in honour of the equine artist James Seymour (1702-1752).

Winners since 1988

See also
 Horse racing in Great Britain
 List of British flat horse races

References 
 Paris-Turf: 

Racing Post: 

Flat races in Great Britain
Newmarket Racecourse
Open middle distance horse races